Krummbach is a small artificial river in Ochsenhausen, Baden-Württemberg, Germany.

It was created by monks of the Ochsenhausen Abbey in the 15th century. It is a tributary of the Steinhauser Rottum.

See also
List of rivers of Baden-Württemberg

References

Rivers of Baden-Württemberg
Rivers of Germany